Saint-Nic is a commune in the Finistère department of Brittany in north-western France.

Population
Inhabitants of Saint-Nic are called in French Saint-Nicais.

See also
Communes of the Finistère department
List of the works of Bastien and Henry Prigent

References

External links

Official website

Mayors of Finistère Association 

Communes of Finistère